Gino Pellegrini (1941 – 20 December 2014) was an Italian film set designer and painter.

Born in Lugo di Vicenza, at age 16 Pellegrini moved to Los Angeles, where he attended the architecture course at UCLA and then achieved a master's degree in Fine Arts. After a brief period of work in the poster advertising field, he entered the cinema industry, where he worked as a scenic painter and set designer. His film works include 2001: A Space Odyssey, Mary Poppins, Fantastic Voyage, Guess Who's Coming to Dinner, The Birds, and West Side Story. After about fifteen years in California, in 1972 he came back to Italy, where he worked in the fields of stage design, video filmmaking and documentaries. In San Giovanni in Persiceto, in two stages between the 1980s and the 1990s, he realized the "Piazzetta degli inganni" ("Little square of deception"), consisting in some trompe-l'œil scenes painted on the walls of the houses around Piazza Betlemme (Betlemme square).

References

External links 
 

1941 births
2014 deaths
20th-century Italian painters
Italian male painters
21st-century Italian painters
People from the Province of Vicenza
University of California, Los Angeles alumni
Italian scenic designers
20th-century Italian male artists
21st-century Italian male artists